Irene Higginbotham (June 11, 1918 – August 27, 1988) was an American songwriter and concert pianist. She is best known for co-writing the Billie Holiday song "Good Morning Heartache" (1946).

Biography
Higginbotham was born on June 11, 1918, in Worcester, Massachusetts. While her closest connection in the popular music of the 1930s and 1940s was Billie Holiday, the prolific songwriter was niece of the classic African-American jazz trombonist J. C. Higginbotham. She was a music student of choral conductor Kemper Harreld, of Morehouse College fame, and Frederic Hall. She was also a concert pianist at the age of 15 and joined the American Society of Composers, Authors and Publishers (ASCAP) in 1944 when she was about 26. She was a composer of nearly 50 published songs.  However, because she was an African-American woman who worked as a composer on Tin Pan Alley during a period when composers there were overwhelmingly white and male, some scholars and musicologists have speculated that Higginbotham may have composed many more songs that were never published and/or where she was never given a credit as a composer or co-composer. It is known that she, like a few other composers, used a pseudonym, in her case "Glenn Gibson", in what was probably an effort to conceal the fact that she was female, and an African-American female at that. While Higginbotham remains one of the least well-known or heralded songwriters, her large contributions to jazz and popular song are undeniable.

Higginbotham died on August 27, 1988, in New York City.

Works
Her popular-song compositions included:
 "Good Morning Heartache" (1946), recorded by Billie Holiday, Joe Williams, Billy Eckstine, Ella Fitzgerald, Tony Bennett and many others
 "No Good Man", recorded by Billie Holiday (1946), and Nina Simone (1961)
 "This Will Make You Laugh", recorded by Nat King Cole Trio in 1941 and in 1993 by daughter Natalie Cole, also Carmen McRae (1955), Marvin Gaye (1978), John Pizzarelli (1992), and Keith Ingham (1998)
 "Are You Livin' Old Man", recorded by Anita O'Day with the Stan Kenton Orchestra (1942), and June Christy with the Stan Kenton Orchestra (1945)
 "It's Mad, Mad, Mad", recorded by Duke Ellington (1947)
 "I Got News for You", recorded by Woody Herman (1948)
 "Mean and Evil Blues", recorded by Dinah Washington (1948)
 "No Sale", recorded by Louis Jordan & His Tympany Five (1945)
 "That Did It, Marie", recorded by Peggy Lee and Benny Goodman & His Orchestra (1941)
 "The Bottle's Empty" recorded by Coleman Hawkins (1945)

Also see ASCAP pages for a partial list.

The two Irenes
Irene Higginbotham is not to be confused with Irene Kitchings (1908-1975), who was married to jazz pianist Teddy Wilson for a short time and wrote the jazz standard Some Other Spring.

References

External links
 Ghosts of Yesterday: Billie Holiday and the Two Irenes (a Jazz Mystery)
 Jazzsphere ten: Good morning Irene, Part 1
 Jazzsphere eleven: Good morning Irene, Part 2

1918 births
1988 deaths
Songwriters from Massachusetts
Musicians from Worcester, Massachusetts
20th-century American women pianists
20th-century American pianists